Thomas Robson may refer to:

Thomas Robson (priest) (died 1934), South African priest
Tom Robson (baseball) (1946–2021), American baseball player
Tommy Robson (footballer, English footballer), born in Gosforth, played for Durham City; see 1927–28 Rochdale A.F.C. season
Tommy Robson (footballer, born 1892), (1892–?), English footballer, born in Scotswood played for Stockport County; see Harry Hardy
Tom Robson (footballer, born 1936) (1936–1981), English footballer
Tommy Robson (1944–2020), English footballer
Tom Robson (footballer, born 1907), English footballer
Thomas Robson (footballer, born 1995), English footballer
Tom Robson (Doctors), a fictional character from Doctors

See also
Thomas Robson-Kanu, English-Welsh footballer
Thomas Robinson (disambiguation)
Tommy Robinson (disambiguation)
Thomas Robbins (disambiguation)
Tommy Robison (born 1961), American football player
Tommy Robson (1944-2020), English footballer